William James Harvey (23 November 1929 – 12 June 2014) was a Scottish footballer.

References

1929 births
Scottish footballers
Bridgeton Waverley F.C. players
Kilmarnock F.C. players
Dunfermline Athletic F.C. players
2014 deaths
Bradford (Park Avenue) A.F.C. players
Sportspeople from Clydebank
Footballers from West Dunbartonshire
Arbroath F.C. players
Bangor F.C. players
Scottish Football League players
English Football League players
Association football inside forwards
Caledonian F.C. players
Scottish Junior Football Association players